My Love, My Bride is a 1990 South Korean romantic comedy film directed by Lee Myung-se. Choi Jin-sil won Best New Actress from the Grand Bell Awards for her role.

Plot 
Young-min works for a publishing company after his graduation upon a college, as dreaming of becoming a writer some day. He marries his college sweetheart, Mi-young, believing that their love would be everlasting.

Cast
Park Joong-hoon - Kim Young-min
Choi Jin-sil - Oh Mi-young
Kim Bo-yeon - Miss Choi
Jeon Moo-song - Editor-in-chief
Song Young-chang
Choi Jong-won - Pastor

Remake

The 2014 remake starred Shin Min-ah and Jo Jung-suk.

See also 
 List of Korean-language films
 Korean cinema

References

External links 
 

1990 films
1990s Korean-language films
1990 romantic comedy films
Films directed by Lee Myung-se
South Korean romantic comedy films